The 1980 Tokyo Indoor, also known by its sponsored name "Seiko World Super Tennis", was a men's tennis tournament played on indoor carpet courts at the Olympic Pool Arena in Tokyo, Japan that was part of the 1980 Volvo Grand Prix circuit. The tournament was held from 27 October through 2 November 1980. It was a major tournament of the Grand Prix tennis circuit and matches were the best of three sets. Second-seeded Jimmy Connors won the singles title and the accompanying $48,000 first-prize money.

Finals

Singles

 Jimmy Connors defeated  Tim Gullikson 6–1, 6–2
 It was Connors's 6th singles title of the year and the 85th of his career.

Doubles

 Victor Amaya /  Hank Pfister defeated  Marty Riessen /  Sherwood Stewart 6–3, 3–6, 7–6

References

External links
 ITF tournament edition details

Tokyo Indoor
Tokyo Indoor
Tokyo Indoor